Imidocarb is a urea derivative used in veterinary medicine as an antiprotozoal agent for the treatment of infection with Babesia (babesiosis) and other parasites.

References

Antiprotozoal agents
Ureas
Imidazolines